The Saint Peter Metropolitan Cathedral, also known as the Tuguegarao Cathedral, is an 18th-century Baroque church located along Rizal Street, Barangay Centro 10, Tuguegarao, Cagayan, Philippines. The church, originally built by Dominican friars, is the seat of the Roman Catholic Archdiocese of Tuguegarao and is considered one of the largest churches in the Cagayan Valley. A historical marker bearing a brief history of the church was installed in 1982 by the National Historical Institute, precursor of the National Historical Commission of the Philippines.

History
Tuguegarao was founded as a mission on May 9, 1604, by Dominican friars. Father Tomas Villa was assigned as its first vicar. Father Villa erected a temporary parochial structure made of light materials with Saint Peter and Saint Paul as patron saints. The current church is attributed to Father Antonio Lobato, OP who initiated the construction in 1761 and was completed in 1768. The reason why it is called "Cathedral" is because of the chair of the Archbishop
 The church sustained heavy damage during World War II and was subsequently rebuilt by Monsignor Bishop Constance Jurgens.

Architecture
The cathedral's façade is described as whimsical and playful. Most notable of all its features is the broken and crested pediment that is mirrored in other churches in the Cagayan Valley namely, the churches of Dupax del Sur and Bambang and Saint Dominic's Cathedral in Nueva Vizcaya. Archival photos of the Calasiao Church in Pangasinan also showed that it once had the “Cagayan-style” pediment. Other notable architectural features of the church are consistently repeated on many of its parts and on the Ermita de San Jacinto, a Spanish-era brick chapel located on the opposite site of the Tuguegarao city proper.

The main focal point of the façade is the deeply recessed oculus. To the left of the church rises the five-storey quadrilateral bell tower. The tower mirrors motifs from the façade such as the pilasters and framed windows. Blind windows can be found on the base. The bell tower is topped with a roofed canopy and a cross.

Some few meters away from the church is the Catholic cemetery with its notable brick arched entryway and fence.

Restoration
Spearheaded by the city's parish priest, Monsignor Gerard Ariston Perez, the parishioners started accumulating 25 million pesos for the restoration of the church. Included in the church's restoration are the rehabilitation of worn-out bricks, reverting the original painted ceiling from the trussed ceiling and the altarpieces.

Image Gallery

External links
 Langway Media - Lakbay Norte

References

Roman Catholic churches in Cagayan
Roman Catholic cathedrals in the Philippines
Buildings and structures in Tuguegarao
Spanish Colonial architecture in the Philippines
Roman Catholic churches completed in 1768
1768 establishments in the Spanish Empire
18th-century Roman Catholic church buildings in the Philippines